St. George Orthodox Church, Chandanapally or Chandanapally Valiyapalli is one of the biggest churches in South India, located at a village named Chandanapally, Pathanamthitta District in Kerala state of India.

History

Chandanapally literally means the abode of sandalwood trees. The church is named after St. George (also the patron saint of England), who slew the dragon snake.

As a village which once had snakes of myriad shapes and venom crawling all over, its residents reposed their faith in the saint to save them from not just snakes but ghosts, demons and other dangers that lurked in the darkness. The first church in Chandanapally was built in 1810. It was renovated in 1875 and consecrated by Mar Abdullah, the Later Patriarch of Antioch. The wooden planks for the new church were brought from the kodumon forest. The logs of teak and sandalwood could not be carried to the work site as the big stream of the Achenkovil River connecting Kodumon and Chandanapally had dried up. Miraculously the stream began to run full to the brim in a torrential rain that lasted for days and the heavy logs could easily be carried to the spot in no time. There was a reconstruction in 2000 which is famous for the huge size of its structure. Indo-Sarsanik art of sculpture was used in its construction. It is a blend of Christian, Muslim and Hindu sculptured art, Gothic-style towers, pillars erected according to mathematics and a roof in Persian style, which altogether gives it the beauty of a beautiful sculpture. The new church structure resembles St Peter's Basilica in Rome.

The Kalkurishu or cross cut from stone which has carvings of saints and angels is a main attraction and shelter for the pilgrims of the church. Whomsoever shelters under st. George here in this church will be rewarded regardless the caste, creed, religion, colour. Hence, many of the pilgrims are non-Christians who believe in the great healing powers of st.George. Usually the feast is held from May1–8. This is one of the church in kerala that constantly celebrates its feast on 7 May, 8 and chempeduppu takes place on 8 May. Hundreds of thousands of pilgrims come from around the world to witness this auspicious and holy ritual.

Chembuduppu

Chembuduppu (meaning picking of copper vessel) is a special ritual that has a place in Kerala’s cultural history. When the old church was built two centuries ago, local Hindus brought rice from different places to feed hundreds of voluntary labourers. They cooked this rice on the bank of the stream and ceremoniously served it to the volunteers. It is in memory of this event that the "Chempeduppu" is celebrated every year. The main offering is rice cooked in a copper pot, which is taken to Kuthirappura by all the pilgrims from different places and the different religions who had gathered there for the celebrations. Later this cooked rice will be taken to their homes by the pilgrims.

The Orthodox church held its festival on 7 and 8 May.

The mortal remains of St. George (Geevarghese Sahada)

St. Geevarghese Sahda is the local name for St. George. The mortal remains of St. Geevarghese Sahda which were kept in Mardion were received by Vattasseril Geevarghese Mar Dionysious (Malankara Metropolitan) and Moran Mar Baselios Geevarghese II Bava from Patriarch of the Holy See of Antioch and brought to Malankara on 1916 and were kept in Kunadara seminary. Later on 6 May 2004 they were received from Moran Mar Baselios Marthoma Mathews II Catholica Bava and kept in Chandanapally. The consecration of St Sahada's mortal remains in Chandanapally where the spiritual presence of St Geevarghese is present was done by Moran Mar Baselios Marthoma Mathews II Catholica Bava on 8 May 2004.

Stone Cross (Kalkurish)

This cross cut from stone, which has carvings of saints and angels, is a main attraction and shelter for the pilgrims visiting the church. It is said that whoever prays here, is immediately rewarded. Heartfelt prayers of the pilgrims are heard and showered with blessings. Some even have a vision of Sahada. Those who prayed by lighting candles on certain Fridays near the Kalkurishu were granted their petitions, without delay. The cross was constructed on the same day in which the Lord's cross was found (14 September). Every year the feast is celebrated on this day. ’Vellappachoru’, which is cooked with rice and coconut, is given as the offering. The pilgrims going to Sabarimala Aiyyappa Temple visiting here is a sight and model for secularism and religious harmony. Many pilgrims shelter here. This church is also known as chandanapally valiyapally which is world-famous. Whoever shelters under st.george will be rewarded.

References

External links

Chandanappally valiapally official website

Churches in Pathanamthitta district
Malankara Orthodox Syrian church buildings
Churches completed in 1810
19th-century Anglican church buildings